In the 2013–14 season, Partizan NIS Belgrade competed in the Basketball League of Serbia, the Radivoj Korać Cup, the Adriatic League and the Euroleague.

Players

NBA Rights
 Dāvis Bertāns - San Antonio Spurs
 Joffrey Lauvergne - Denver Nuggets

Current roster

Depth chart

Roster changes

In

Out

Competitions

Basketball League of Serbia

Standings

P=Matches played, W=Matches won, L=Matches lost, F=Points for, A=Points against, D=Points difference, Pts=Points

Results and positions by round

Matches

Regular season

Radivoj Korać Cup

Quarterfinals

Adriatic League

Standings 

Pld - Played; W - Won; L - Lost; PF - Points for; PA - Points against; Diff - Difference; Pts - Points.

Results and positions by round

Regular season

Semifinals

Euroleague

Regular season

Standings 

Group A

</onlyinclude>

{{basketballbox collapsible|bg=#FFCCCC
 | round = 10
 | date = 19 December 2013
 | time = 20:45
 | report = Report
 | teamA = Partizan 
 | scoreA = 62
 | scoreB = 73
 | Q1 = 19–20
 | Q2 = 17–23
 | Q3 = 13–16
 | Q4 = 13'–''14 | OT = 
 | teamB =  CSKA Moscow
 | points1 = Milosavljević 17
 | rebounds1 = Kinsey 6
 | assist1 = Bogdanović 6
 | points2 = Kaun 12
 | rebounds2 = Weems 6
 | assist2 = Teodosić 7
 | arena = Pionir Hall
 | place = Belgrade
 | attendance = 8,147
 | referee = Dani Hierrezuelo (ESP), Murat Biricik (TUR), Elias Koromilas (GRE)
}}

Top 16

 Standings Group FIndividual awardsEuroleagueRising Star Bogdan BogdanovićAdriatic LeagueThe ideal five
 Bogdan Bogdanović 
 Joffrey Lauvergne

MVP of the Round
 Léo Westermann – Round 2
 Tarence Kinsey – Round 5
 Bogdan Bogdanović – Round 9
 Bogdan Bogdanović – Round 19Basketball League of Serbia'''

Finals MVP
 Bogdan Bogdanović

Top scorer
 Bogdan Bogdanović

MVP of the Round
 Joffrey Lauvergne – Round 9

Statistics

Adriatic League

References

External links
 Official website 
 

2013-14 
2013–14 in Serbian basketball by club
2013–14 Euroleague by club